Philip Coggan is a British business journalist, news correspondent, and author who has written for The Economist since 2006. At the paper he authored the weekly Bartleby column on work and management until August 2021. He served as the writer of the Buttonwood column on finance before John O'Sullivan took over in 2018. Prior to joining The Economist, Coggan worked for the Financial Times for 20 years, from 1986 to 2006.

He was educated at Sidney Sussex College, Cambridge. In 2008, Coggan was named "Senior Financial Journalist of the Year" by the Wincott Foundation and in 2009 he was voted Best "Communicator" at the Business Journalist of the Year Awards. The CFA Society of the United Kingdom named him "Journalist of the Year" in 2016.

Books
Coggan, Philip (1986, 2009). The Money Machine: How the City Works. London: Penguin Books. 
Coggan, Philip (2000). Easy Money: How to Avoid the Pitfalls of Losing Everything and Making Nothing. London: Profile Books Ltd. 
Coggan, Philip (2005). The Economist Guide to Hedge Funds. London: Profile Books Ltd. 
Coggan, Philip (2011). Paper Promises: Money, Debt and the New World Order. London: PublicAffairs. 
Coggan, Philip (2013). The Last Vote: the Threats to Western Democracy. London: Allen Lane. 
Coggan, Philip (2020). More: A History of the World Economy from the Iron Age to the Information Age. London: The Economist.

See also 
 Greenspan put, subject on which Coggan has written in the FT
 List of British journalists

References

Living people
Alumni of Sidney Sussex College, Cambridge
British columnists
British financial writers
The Economist people
Year of birth missing (living people)